Great Plains Conservation is conservation and tourism organization, it helps manage several wildlife reserves in Kenya, Botswana and Zimbabwe. The group currently operates 18 safari camps, which include luxury lodges and tented camps. Great Plains Conservation works together with local governments and community groups to promote low-density, environmentally conscious tourism, supplying economic incentives for the protection of wildlife.

Great Plains Conservation was founded in 2006 by a group of conservationists and filmmakers. Its CEO is Dereck Joubert.

Dereck and Beverly Joubert are National Geographic wildlife filmmakers, behind titles such as Last Lions and Eye of the Leopard. Dereck Joubert is also a National Geographic Explorer at large.

References

Nature conservation organizations based in Africa
Nature conservation in South Africa
Ecotourism
Environmental organisations based in South Africa
Non-profit organisations based in South Africa
Environmental organizations established in 2006
2006 establishments in South Africa